Laudelino Cubino González (born 31 May 1963) is a Spanish former professional road racing cyclist.  He was born in Béjar, Spain.

Career achievements

Major results

1986
Clásica a los Puertos de Guadarrama
1987
Vuelta a España:
Winner stage 7
1988
Clásica a los Puertos de Guadarrama
Tour de France:
Winner stage 15
Vuelta a España:
4th place overall classification
1990
Alqueirias
 Spanish National Road Race Championship
Subida al Naranco
Volta a Catalunya
1991
Vuelta a España:
Winner stage 16
1992
Vuelta a España:
Winner stage 8
6th place overall classification
1993
Vuelta a Burgos
Vuelta a España:
3rd place overall classification
1994
Tour of Galicia
Giro d'Italia:
Winner stage 7
1995
Giro d'Italia:
Winner stage 8
1996
Vuelta a Colombia:
Winner stage 1
Cerdanyola

Source:

Grand Tour general classification results timeline

References

External links
Official website 

1963 births
Living people
People from Béjar
Sportspeople from the Province of Salamanca
Cyclists from Castile and León
Spanish Giro d'Italia stage winners
Spanish Tour de France stage winners
Spanish Vuelta a España stage winners
Vuelta a Colombia stage winners
Spanish male cyclists